Fort Hope are a British rock band formed in 2013 after the disbandment of electronic rock band My Passion in 2012. The band has released three EPs and released their debut mini-album in May 2014, which peaked at 8 on the UK top Rock and Metal albums.

History

Formation and EP releases (2013–2014)
The band consists of four former members of the electronic rock band My Passion, the line-up consisting of Jon Gaskin, Simon Rowlands and Jamie Nicholls, who all agreed to stay together and form a new band while Laurence Rene, the former singer of My Passion, did not. The band was officially announced on 13 January 2013 along with the release of their first song titled 'Control'. The song was aired on BBC Radio a month later. In April the band embarked on their first ever tour supporting Fearless Vampire Killers throughout April in the UK.

The first album release by the band was in the same year when they released their debut EP titled 'The Future's in Our Hearts' and was free to download after it was streamed online in June, also officially releasing the song 'Control' as the EPs official single, of which they also released their first music video for. In November they released their second EP titled 'Choices'.

Courage  (2014–present)
In 2014 they embarked on a tour in the UK along with Max Raptor in January 2014 across the UK, making it their first tour they've embarked on as a headliner and they were also announced to be part of the LAB Records roster and would be releasing their debut mini album titled 'Courage' on 11 May. To promote the release the band released an official music video for the song 'The Rapture'. In July the band released their music video for the song 'New Life' and a month later the band performed at Sonisphere Festival. The band are supported rock band Mallory Knox in the UK throughout November along with Frank Iero and Moose Blood.

On 7 November the band released their second single titled 'Plans' in promotion of their third EP release named after the band which was released on 8 February 2015. They also released 'Sick' as the second single to promote the EP and released a music video for 'Plans' two days prior to the EPs release.

2015 – Current 
Fort Hope have continued to grow with numerous plays on Radio 1. They have been nominated for "Best British Newcomer" in the 2015 Kerrang! Awards and played on the Fresh Blood stage at Slam Dunk Festival. In the summer they will play 2000 trees, T in the Park and Reading & Leeds.
They parted with Virgin EMI in 2018 after being signed in 2016.

From the end of 2017, Fort Hope ceased all social media updates. 

In 2022, Fort Hope finally returned to social media to announce they were touring as an opening act for LostAlone in December 2022, alongside potentially working on new music

Members

Current 
 Jon Gaskin – vocals, guitar, piano (2013–present)
 Jamie Nicholls – drums (2013–present)
 Simon Rowlands – bass guitar (2013–present)

Unofficial members 
 Matthew Whelan – guitar (2014–2015)
 Peter Oliver – guitar (2015–present)

Previous members 
 Ande D'Mello – guitar (2013–2015)

Discography

Albums

Mini-albums

EPs

Singles

Music videos

References 

Musical groups established in 2013
British musical trios
English rock music groups
2013 establishments in England